Enterodiol is an organic compound with the formula [HOC6H4CH2CH(CH2OH)]2.  

It is formed by the action of intestinal bacteria on lignan precursors. As such it is sometimes classified as a enterolignan or mammalian lignan. Elevated levels of enterodiol in urine are attributed consumption of tea and other lignan-rich foods.

References

Polyols
Lignans
Phenols